Dan Ahti Tolppanen (born 11 June 1981) is a Finnish rapper, better known by his stage name Uniikki (meaning unique). He is the co-founder in of Rähinä Records (founded in 1998) with Elastinen, Iso H, Andu and Tasis.

Uniikki was born to a Jewish mother and Finnish father. He is a nephew of Finnish politician Ben Zyskowicz. He grew up in Malminkartano, Helsinki. Uniikki gained fame through membership in Finnish band Kapasiteettiyksikkö. For some recordings, he appeared in Rähinä (effectively a duo effort of Elastinen & Uniikki). He works as a solo act, and signed to his own Rähinä Records, but also has a great number of collaborations.

Discography

Albums

Mixtapes
2008: Nuor Tolppanen vol. 1
2011: 8190 (mixtape with MG:n)
2012: Nuor Tolppanen vol. 2

Singles
Charting

Others
2005: "En pyydä muuta" (with Illi)
2009: "Myrskyn silmäs" (with Mia)
2009: "Niinku elokuvis" (with Jimi Pääkallo)
2011: "Suurempaa" (with Mia)
2011: "Kesäbaustaa"
2011: "Kunnon mestaan vetää" (with Elastinen & Spekti)
2011: "Ulkopuolelle" (with Tasis)
2012: "Paita pois"
2012: (FIN #16)
Promotional singles
2008: "Vaik mitä tekis"
2008: "Sä et enää rakasta mua"
2009: "Tehdään tää näin" (with Wörlin & RZY)
As Rähinä – Elastinen & Uniikki

Featured in

References

External links
Uniikki Myspace
Uniikki Facebook
Uniikki Rähinä Recordspage

Finnish hip hop musicians
Jewish rappers
Finnish Jews
1981 births
Living people
Jewish hip hop record producers
Finnish hip hop record producers